Koibatek Sub-County is a Sub-County in the Baringo County of Kenya. Its head quarters is Eldama Ravine. The Sub-County as an area of 2,306 km² .

The Sub-County has two electoral constituencies : 
Mogotio Constituency
Eldama Ravine Constituency

See also
Bill Kipsang Rotich

 
Former districts of Kenya